John Brian "Joe" Neilands (September 11, 1921 – October 23, 2008) was a Canadian-born American biochemist and professor of biochemistry at the University of California, Berkeley, where he taught from 1951 until his retirement in 1993.

Early life and education
Neilands was born on September 11, 1921 in Glen Valley, British Columbia, to Thomas Abraham Neilands and Mary Rebecca Neilands (née Harpur), both of whom immigrated from Northern Ireland. He received his undergraduate degree from the University of Guelph in 1944, his master's degree from Dalhousie University in 1946, and his Ph.D. from the University of Wisconsin, Madison in biochemistry in 1949. He then completed a postdoctoral fellowship at the Karolinska Institutet's Medical Nobel Institute in Stockholm, Sweden.

Career
Neilands joined the faculty of the University of California, Berkeley in 1951 as an assistant professor, where he remained until he retired in 1993. In 1958, he was named a Guggenheim Fellow; during his fellowship, he studied in London, Copenhagen, and Vienna. In 1974, he was named an honorary professor at the University of San Marcos in Peru. One of his doctoral students was Kary Mullis, who received a Ph.D. under his supervision in 1973 and won a Nobel Prize in 1993.

Research
Neilands' main area of research was microbial iron transport. His early research (from 1950 to 1952) focused on enzymes, including the isolation of cytochrome c from different sources, and on identifying its properties. In 1957, he was the first to note that ferrichrome could act as an iron transport agent.

Books
In 1958, Neilands and his colleague Paul K. Stumpf co-authored a textbook, Outlines of Enzyme Chemistry, that has been called "seminal". He also wrote the book Harvest of Death, which discussed the putative dangers of herbicides and defoliants and was published in 1971.

Political activism
Neilands was very active in politics; most notably, in the 1950s, he successfully fought to prevent Pacific Gas and Electric Company from building a nuclear reactor at Bodega Bay. In the late 1960s, he ran, unsuccessfully, for the Berkeley City Council. He also protested against the Vietnam War and the Gulf War on the UC Berkeley campus.

Death
Neilands died on October 23, 2008 at the age of 87, after briefly battling a rare form of tuberculosis.

References

1921 births
2008 deaths
American biochemists
University of California, Berkeley faculty
University of Guelph alumni
Dalhousie University alumni
 University of Wisconsin–Madison College of Letters and Science alumni
Canadian emigrants to the United States